Carbonic anhydrase 13 is a protein that in humans is encoded by the CA13 gene.

Function 
Carbonic anhydrases (CAs) are a family of zinc metalloenzymes that catalyze the interconversion between carbon dioxide and water and the dissociated ions of carbonic acid (i.e.  bicarbonate and hydrogen ions).

References

Further reading

External links